Muskoka Lakes Museum is an independent non-profit community museum, focusing on the history of the Muskoka Lakes. It is located in the village of Port Carling in the Township of Muskoka Lakes, District of Muskoka, in Ontario, Canada.

The museum features six different galleries with exhibits about First Nations and area pioneer history, the history and culture of boating in the Muskoka Lakes region, cottages and resorts, and a gallery for local art exhibits.  Though there are artifacts from as early as 8000 B.C.E. on display, the main focus of the museum is between the mid-1800s and mid-1900s.

The museum is open for a summer season each year from Victoria Day weekend until the Canadian Thanksgiving Day weekend.  Many programs are run at the museum for children, including programs for school groups and day-camper programs in the summer. The museum also runs themed children's parties and offers an assortment of children's activity programs, such as scavenger hunts and interactive exhibits.

The museum runs walking tours of the village of Port Carling weekly in July and August, and holds a series of lectures every Wednesday evening during the summer.

History 
The idea for the Muskoka Lakes Museum was conceived when Marion Catto started the Port Carling Historical Society on September 9, 1961.

The Muskoka Lakes Museum was first opened on July 2, 1967, under the name “The Port Carling Museum”. The sign that was displayed above the front entrance at the time of opening, and now hangs in the Museum's Marine Room.

In 1972 the museum put in an addition in order to accommodate more artifacts and called it the Catto Wing, named in honour of Marion Catto and her husband, Lieutenant-Colonel Catto. Another addition was added in 1976 and again in 1977.

In 1982 the museum purchased a log cabin from Alex Brown, the owner at the time. The cabin had been originally owned by the Hall family, who built it in 1875 in the village of Glen Orchard, after moving there from London, Ontario. The log cabin was disassembled from its spot in Glen Orchard and reassembled at the museum in 1983. In that same year another addition was made to serve as the gift shop.

On July 14, 1984, the Log Cabin was opened officially to the public.

In 1989 the Board of Directors changed the name of the museum to the “Muskoka Lakes Museum” in order to be able to represent and serve all of the Muskoka Lakes District and not just the village of Port Carling.

References

External links
 Muskoka Lakes Museum - official site

Museums in the District Municipality of Muskoka
Local museums in Canada